Events from the year 1975 in the United States.

Incumbents

Federal Government 
 President: Gerald Ford (R-Michigan)
 Vice President: Nelson Rockefeller (R-New York)
 Chief Justice: Warren E. Burger (Minnesota)
 Speaker of the House of Representatives: Carl Albert (D-Oklahoma)
 Senate Majority Leader: Mike Mansfield (D-Montana)
 Congress: 93rd (until January 3), 94th (starting January 3)

Events

January
 January – Volkswagen introduces the Golf, its new front-wheel-drive economy car, in the United States and Canada as the Volkswagen Rabbit.
 January 1 – Watergate scandal: John N. Mitchell, H. R. Haldeman and John Ehrlichman are found guilty of the Watergate cover-up.
 January 2 – The Federal Rules of Evidence are approved by the United States Congress.
 January 6 
AM America makes its television debut on ABC.
Wheel of Fortune premieres on NBC.
 The Indiana Law Enforcement Academy begins operations.
 January 8
Ella Grasso becomes Governor of Connecticut, the first woman U.S. governor who did not succeed her husband.
President Gerald Ford appoints Vice President Nelson Rockefeller to head a special commission looking into alleged domestic abuses by the CIA.
 January 12 – Super Bowl IX: The Pittsburgh Steelers defeat the Minnesota Vikings 16–6 at Tulane Stadium in New Orleans, Louisiana.
 January 15 
 The Carousel of Progress moves to Walt Disney World from Disneyland.
 Steel roller coaster Space Mountain (Magic Kingdom) opens at Walt Disney World in Florida, becoming one of the park's most popular attractions into the 21st century.
 January 18 – The United States Atomic Energy Commission is divided between the Energy Research and Development Administration and the Nuclear Regulatory Commission, partly in response to the 1973 oil crisis.
 January 20 – Talent agent Michael Ovitz founds the Creative Artists Agency.
 January 26 – Immaculata University defeats the University of Maryland 80–48 in the first nationally televised women's basketball game in the United States.
 January 29 – The Weather Underground bombs the U.S. State Department main office in Washington, D.C.
 January 31 – Be My Valentine, Charlie Brown premieres on CBS, but did not win the Nielsen Ratings (Rival NBC won that day at the 8PM Hour).

February
 February 2 – The 7.6  Near Islands earthquake hits the Aleutian Islands in Alaska with a maximum Mercalli intensity of IX (Violent), injuring 15.
 February 13 – Fire breaks out in the World Trade Center.
 February 21 – Watergate scandal: Former United States Attorney General John N. Mitchell, and former White House aides H. R. Haldeman and John Ehrlichman, are sentenced to between 30 months and 8 years in prison.
 February 23 – In response to the energy crisis, daylight saving time commences nearly two months early in the United States.

March
 March 9 – Construction of the Trans-Alaska Pipeline System begins.
 March 10 – The Rocky Horror Show opens on Broadway in New York City with 4 performances.
 March 19 – The release of Tommy, a musical/drama produced by Ken Russel and Robert Stigwood.
 March 29 – Blow by Blow by Jeff Beck is released. It would become his most successful album in the United States, reaching the top five and selling over one million copies.
 March 30 – James Ruppert murders 11 family members inside his home on Easter Sunday.
 March 31 – In his final game on the sideline, John Wooden coaches UCLA to its 10th national championship in 12 seasons when the Bruins defeat Kentucky 92–85 in the title game at San Diego.

April
 April 3 – Bobby Fischer refuses to play in a chess match against Anatoly Karpov, giving Karpov the title.
 April 4
Vietnam War: The first military Operation Babylift flight, C5A 80218, crashes 27 minutes after takeoff, killing 138 on board; 176 survive the crash.
Bill Gates founds Microsoft in Albuquerque, New Mexico.
 April 8 – The 47th Academy Awards ceremony, hosted by Bob Hope, Shirley MacLaine, Sammy Davis Jr. and Frank Sinatra, is held at Dorothy Chandler Pavilion in Los Angeles. Francis Ford Coppola's The Godfather Part II wins six awards (twice as many as its predecessor), including Best Picture and Best Director for Coppola. The sequel is tied with Roman Polanski's Chinatown in receiving 11 nominations. It is the final ceremony aired by NBC.
 April 15 – Karen Ann Quinlan, 21, faints after consuming Quaaludes at a party. She becomes a controversial subject in the right to die movement after her parents sue to have her comatose body removed from life-support. She lives off a feeding tube until 1985.
 April 29 – Operation Frequent Wind – Americans and their allies are evacuated from South Vietnam by helicopter.
 April 30 – Vietnam War: The Fall of Saigon: The Vietnam War ends as Communist forces take Saigon, resulting in mass evacuations of Americans and South Vietnamese.  As the capital is taken, South Vietnam surrenders unconditionally.

May
 May – The unemployment rate peaks at 9.0% ending the Post-War Boom. 
 May 5 – The Busch Gardens Williamsburg theme park, originally known as Busch Gardens: The Old Country, opens in Williamsburg, Virginia.
 May 6 – A violent F4 tornado hits the Omaha metropolitan area, killing three and injuring more than 137.
 May 12 – Mayaguez incident: Khmer Rouge forces in Cambodia seize the United States merchant ship SS Mayaguez in international waters.
 May 15 – Mayaguez incident: The American merchant ship Mayaguez, seized by Cambodian forces, is rescued by the U.S. Navy and Marines; 38 Americans are killed.
 May 17 – Elton John's Captain Fantastic and the Brown Dirt Cowboy becomes the first album to enter the US Billboard 200 album chart at Number One.
 May 25 
 The Golden State Warriors win the 1975 NBA basketball championship.
 Indianapolis 500: Bobby Unser wins for a second time in a rain-shorted 174 lap, 435 mile (696 km) race.
May 27 — In the National Hockey League, The Philadelphia Flyers defeat the Buffalo Sabres 2-0 in game six of the finals to claim their second straight Stanley Cup.
 May 30 – American distance runner Steve Prefontaine dies in car accident in Eugene, Oregon.

June
 June 10 – In Washington, DC, the Rockefeller Commission issues its report on CIA abuses, recommending a joint congressional oversight committee on intelligence.
 June 20 - Universal Pictures releases Steven Spielberg's adaptation of Peter Benchley's bestseller Jaws in 409 cinemas across the United States. The coupling of this broad distribution pattern with the movie's then even rarer national television marketing campaign has yielded a release method virtually unheard-of. Regardless, the film ultimately brings in $123.1 million by the end of its initial run, and is considered to be the first modern blockbuster as a result.
 June 26 – Two FBI agents and one AIM member die in a shootout at the Pine Ridge Indian Reservation in South Dakota.

July

 July 6 – Ruffian, an American champion thoroughbred racehorse breaks down in a match race against Kentucky Derby winner, Foolish Pleasure; she has to be euthanized the following day.
 July 17 – Apollo–Soyuz Test Project: An American Apollo and Soviet Soyuz spacecraft dock in orbit, marking the first such link-up between spacecraft from the two nations. It is also the last Apollo mission and the last manned U.S. space mission until STS-1 (the first Space Shuttle orbital flight).
 July 22 – Stanley Forman takes the photo Fire Escape Collapse.
 July 30 – In Detroit, Michigan, Teamsters Union president Jimmy Hoffa is reported missing. He is never found and is declared dead in absentia in 1982.

August
 August 1 – The 5.7  Oroville earthquake affects Butte County, California, with a maximum Mercalli intensity of VIII (Severe), injuring 10 and causing $3 million in damage.
 August 3 – The Louisiana Superdome opens in New Orleans.
 August 5 – U.S. President Ford posthumously pardons Robert E. Lee, restoring full rights of citizenship.
 August 7–11 – The Special Olympics World Games take place in Mount Pleasant, Michigan.
 August 8 – Samuel Bronfman II, son of Seagram president Edgar Bronfman, is kidnapped in Purchase, New York. He is rescued after a ransom is paid. 
 August 20 – Viking program: NASA launches the Viking 1 planetary probe toward Mars.
 August 25 – Bruce Springsteen's album Born to Run is released.

September
 September 5 – In Sacramento, California, Lynette Fromme, a follower of jailed cult leader Charles Manson, attempts to assassinate U.S. President Gerald Ford, but is thwarted by a Secret Service agent.
 September 9 – Riverfront Coliseum opens in Cincinnati.
 September 14 – Elizabeth Seton is canonized, becoming the first American Roman Catholic saint.
 September 18 – Fugitive Patricia Hearst is captured in San Francisco.
 September 22 – U.S. President Gerald Ford survives a second assassination attempt, this time by Sara Jane Moore in San Francisco.

October
 October 1 – Thrilla in Manila: Muhammad Ali defeats Joe Frazier in a boxing match in Manila, Philippines.
 October 11 – NBC airs the first episode of Saturday Night Live (George Carlin is the first host; Billy Preston and Janis Ian the first musical guests).
 October 21 – 1975 World Series: US baseball team the Boston Red Sox defeat the Cincinnati Reds in Game 6 off Carlton Fisk's 12th-inning home run in one of the most famous World Series games ever played. The following day, the series ends with Game 7 victory by the Reds, in a broadcast that breaks records for a televised sporting event.

November
 November 3 
 An independent audit of Mattel, one of the United States' largest toy manufacturers, reveals that company officials fabricated press releases and financial information to "maintain the appearance of continued corporate growth".
 The long-running television game show The Price Is Right expands from 30 minutes to its current hour-long format on CBS.
 November 5 – Travis Walton, a 22-year-old logger, is working in the Apache-Sitgreaves National Forest with six co-workers near Snowflake, Arizona, when he suddenly disappears. Walton is found five days later and says that he has been abducted by extraterrestrial aliens. His book, The Walton Experience (1978), will become the basis for a film, Fire in the Sky (1993).
 November 10 – The bulk carrier Edmund Fitzgerald sinks 15 miles off of Whitefish Point, Michigan, losing all 29 crew on board.
 November 20 – Former California Governor Ronald Reagan enters the race for the Republican presidential nomination, challenging incumbent President Gerald Ford.
 November 29 
The name "Micro-soft" (for microcomputer software) is used by Bill Gates in a letter to Paul Allen for the first time (Microsoft becomes a registered trademark on November 26, 1976).
 While disabled, the submarine tender USS Proteus (AS-19) discharges radioactive coolant water into Apra Harbor, Guam. A Geiger counter at two of the harbor's public beaches shows 100 millirems/hour, 50 times the allowable dose.
 The 7.4  Hawaii earthquake hits several of the Hawaiian Islands with a maximum Mercalli intensity of VIII (Severe), causing two deaths, up to 28 injuries, and a destructive tsunami.

December
 December 8 – New York City is approved for a bailout of $2.3 billion each year through to 1978 – $6.9 billion total.
 December 18 – The Lutz family moves into 112 Ocean Avenue, Amityville, Long Island, New York, in the United States, only to flee from the house after 28 days, which will go on to inspire the story of The Amityville Horror.
 December 23 – United States Congress passes the Metric Conversion Act which encourages, but does not mandate, metrication in the United States and establishes the Metric Board.
 December 25 – The first Family Express opens in Valparaiso, Indiana.  
 December 29 – A bomb explosion at LaGuardia Airport kills 11.

Ongoing
 Cold War (1947–1991)
 Space Race (1957–1975)
 Détente (c. 1969–1979)
 Capital punishment suspended by Furman v. Georgia (1972–1976)
 1970s energy crisis (1973–1980)
 DOCUMERICA photography project (1972–1977)

Births

January

 January 2
 Emanuel Augustus, boxer
 Corey Brewer, basketball player
 Ryan Brown, actor
 Dax Shepard, actor
 Jeff Suppan, baseball player
 January 3
 Danica McKellar, actress and education advocate
 Jason Marsden, actor
 January 4
 Dan Beery, Olympic rower
 Shane Carwin, mixed martial artist and wrestler
 January 5
 Riley Breckenridge, drummer for Thrice
 Bradley Cooper, actor and filmmaker
 Mike Grier, ice hockey player 
 January 6
 Laura Berg, softball player
 Big Fase 100, rapper
 Nicole DeHuff, actress (d. 2005) 
 James Farrior, football player
 January 7
 Steve Bell, soccer player
 Stephanie Birkitt, attorney
 January 8 – Justin Alfond, politician and real estate developer
 January 9 – Vince Amey, football player and coach
 January 10 – Jake Delhomme, football player 
 January 11
 Kabir Akhtar, director and editor
 Brad Badger, football player
 Chris Burrous, journalist (d. 2018)
 Rory Fitzpatrick, ice hockey player  
 January 13 – Andrew Yang, entrepreneur, political commentator, founder of Venture for America, and 2020 Democratic presidential candidate
 January 14
 Shawn Barber, football player
 Ricardo López, Uruguayan-born pest control worker (d. 1996)
 January 16
 Steve Adams, bassist for Animal Liberation Orchestra
 Kevin Boles, baseball coach
 Ray Bowles, singer
 Brian C. Buescher, judge
 January 17
 Brian Brushwood, magician, podcaster, author, lecturer, YouTuber, and comedian
 Freddy Rodriguez, actor
 January 18 – Marcus Brandon, politician
 January 19
 Maurice Anderson, football player
 Steve Balderson, director
 Noah Georgeson, singer/songwriter, guitarist and producer
 January 20
 David Eckstein, baseball player
 Eric Healey, ice hockey player
 January 21
 Saqib Ali, politician
 Zach Helm, writer, director, and producer 
 January 22
 Calvin Brock, boxer
 Balthazar Getty, actor 
 January 23
 Kevin Alexander, football player
 B.G. Knocc Out, rapper and songwriter
 Brian Balmages, composer, conductor, and educator
 Phil Dawson, football player
 Tito Ortiz, mixed martial artist, referee, and actor
 Fred Coleman, football player and coach
 January 24 – Matt B. Britton, new media entrepreneur and consumer trend expert
 January 25
 Clover Boykin, convicted murderer
 Tim Montgomery, Olympic sprinter
 Ricky Rodriguez, convicted murderer (d. 2005) 
 John Wade, football player
 January 27 – Darrin Bell, cartoonist and comic writer
 January 28 – Terri Conn, actress  
 January 29
 Sharif Atkins, actor
 Tony Blevins, football player
 Sara Gilbert, actress
 January 31 – Zenarae Antoine, basketball player and coach

February

 February 1 – Big Boi, rapper, actor, and member of Outkast
 February 2 – Aramis Ayala, politician
 February 3 – Nicholas Anderson, rower
 February 6
 Matt Alber, singer/songwriter, filmmaker, and youth advocate
 Chad Allen, baseball player
 Jason Buha, golfer
 February 7
 Wes Borland, guitarist for Limp Bizkit and frontman for Black Light Burns
 Daniel Gade, Army Lieutenant colonel, disabled veteran, and political candidate
 February 8
 Jonah Blechman, actor
 Lil Nat, radio host
 Shane Shamrock, wrestler (d. 1998)
 February 9
 Terry Billups, football player
 Dave Brainard, record producer
 February 10 – Scott Elrod, actor
 February 11
 Lori Alhadeff, activist and founder of Make Our Schools Safe
 Jacque Vaughn, basketball player
 February 12
 Jen Armbruster, Paralympic goalball player
 Bobby Billings, singer/songwriter
 Cliff Bleszinski, video game designer
 Michael Ray Bower, actor
 February 13 – Lizzie Fletcher, politician
 February 16
 Eddie Benton, basketball player and coach
 Daryl Bonilla, actor, comedian, and wrestler
 February 17 – David Goggins, marathon runner, triathlete, and Navy SEAL
 February 18
 Ila Borders, baseball player
 Sarah Joy Brown, actress
 February 20 – Brian Littrell, pop singer and member of the Backstreet Boys
 February 21
 Bo Atterberry, football coach
 Brandon Berger, baseball player
 February 22 – Drew Barrymore, actress, author, director, model, and producer
 February 23
 Pat Barnes, football player
 Mike Flood, politician
 February 25 – Chelsea Handler, comedian and television host
 February 26 – Tunde Adebimpe, musician, singer/songwriter, actor, director, and visual artist
 February 27 – Joel Burns, basketball player
 February 28 – Adam Banton, BMX rider

March

 March 2
 Jesse Bochco, director and producer
 Macey Brooks, football player
 March 3
 Tracy Anderson, entrepreneur and author
 Wendi Michelle Scott, criminal convicted of abusing her daughter in a case of Münchausen syndrome by proxy
 March 4 – Jerod Turner, golfer
 March 5
 Obafemi Ayanbadejo, football player
 Jolene Blalock, actress
 Niki Taylor, model
 March 6 – Terry Bruce, politician
 March 7
 Audrey Marie Anderson, actress
 T. J. Thyne, actor
 March 8
 Billy Austin, football player
 Josh Gottheimer, politician
 March 9
 Matthew J. Blit, attorney
 Oni Buchanan, poet and pianist
 March 10
 Jamie Arnold, American-born Israeli basketball player
 Kathy Brier, actress and singer
 March 11
 DJ Lord, DJ and turntablist
 Eric the Actor, TV personality (d. 2014)
 March 13 – Chris Ashworth, actor
 March 15
 Cornell Brown, football player
 Eva Longoria, actress
 will.i.am, rapper and singer, member of the Black Eyed Peas
 March 16 – Tara Buck, actress
 March 17
 Jorge Boehringer, composer
 Leonard Byrd, sprinter
 Natalie Zea, actress
 March 18
 Sutton Foster, actress
 Brian Griese, football player
 Matthew Tuerk, politician, mayor of Allentown, Pennsylvania
 March 19
 Michael Alsbury, test pilot (d. 2014)
 Brann Dailor, drummer for Mastodon
 March 20
 Jennifer Arroyo, American-born Canadian bassist for Kittie
 Ramin Bahrani, director and screenwriter
 Eric Brown, football player
 Andy Schor, politician, mayor of Lansing, Michigan
 March 21 – Justin Pierce, British-American actor/skater (d. 2000)
 March 22
 Chris Bayne, football player
 Jeremy Brigham, football player and coach
 Guillermo Díaz, actor
 Anne Dudek, actress
 Cole Hauser, actor
 March 23
 Shenna Bellows, politician
 Matthew Bradford, politician
 Heather Bowie Young, golfer
 March 25 – Damon Bruce, sports radio host
 March 27
 Anthony Bass, football player
 Fergie, singer and actress, member of the Black Eyed Peas (2002-2018)
 March 28
 James Allen, football player
 Omar Brown, football player
 Richard Kelly, director
 Ashley Moody, politician
 March 28 – Kusanti Abdul-Salaam, football player
 March 30 – Ben Barnes, politician

April

 April 1
 John Butler, American-born Australian singer/songwriter and music producer
 Geoff Duncan, politician, 12th Lieutenant Governor of Georgia
 April 2
 Nate Huffman, basketball player (d. 2015)
 Pedro Pascal, Chilean-born actor
 Adam Rodriguez, actor
 Deedee Magno Hall, actress and singer
 April 3
 Shawn Bates, ice hockey player
 Aries Spears, stand-up comedian, actor, and writer
 April 4 – Scott Rolen, baseball player
 April 5
 Mike Bloom, musician, singer, composer, producer, and mixer
 Juicy J, rapper, songwriter, and record producer for Three 6 Mafia
 April 6
 Leigh Bardugo, Israeli-born author
 Zach Braff, actor
 April 7
 Ronde Barber, football player
 Tiki Barber, football player
 Ronnie Belliard, baseball player
 Mike Bundlie, artist, producer, entrepreneur, author, and publisher
 Heather Burns, actress
 John Cooper, guitarist, singer, and frontman for Skillet
 April 8
 Jeff Banks, football player and coach
 Carlton Bost, guitarist
 Nick Browder, football player
 April 9
 Sunny Anderson, television personality
 David Gordon Green, filmmaker
 April 10
 Marc Breuers, race car driver
 Chris Carrabba, singer and guitarist 
 David Harbour, actor
 April 11 – Scott O. Brown, writer, letterer, publisher, editor, and production manager
 April 12
 Marcie Alberts, basketball player and coach
 Matt Bettencourt, golfer
 April 13 – Jeff Balis, filmmaker
 April 14
 Amy Birnbaum, voice actress
 Lita, wrestler
 April 15
 A-Plus, rapper and producer
 Chester Burnett, football player
 Paul Dana, racing driver (d. 2006)
 Philip Labonte, singer and frontman for All That Remains and Shadows Fall (1997–1999)
 April 16
 Keon Clark, basketball player
 Sean Maher, actor
 Kron Moore, actress and singer
 Karl Yune, actor
 April 18
 JD Albert, engineer, inventor, and educator
 Dre Allen, actor, singer/songwriter, music video director, and producer
 April 19
 Radley Balko, journalist
 Townsend Bell, motorcycle racer
 Brent Billingsley, baseball player
 April 21
 Lemon Andersen, actor and poet
 Benjamin Butler, painter
 Jodi Kantor, journalist
 Killer Mike, rapper, songwriter, actor and activist 
 April 22 – Ginny Owens, singer/songwriter, author, and blogger
 April 23 – Stacey Borgman, Olympic rower
 April 25
 Erin Alexander, basketball player
 Laura Bennett, Olympic triathlete
 Emily Burt, soccer player
 April 26
 Joey Jordison, drummer for Slipknot (d. 2021)
 India Summer, actress
 April 27
 Rabih Abdullah, football player
 Michael Booker, football player
 Koopsta Knicca, rapper for Three 6 Mafia (d. 2015)
 April 29
 Josh Booty, baseball player
 Eric Koston, skateboarder
 April 30
 Mike Chat, actor
 Johnny Galecki, Belgian-born actor

May

 May 1
 Jason Barickman, politician
 Bob Boldon, basketball player and coach
 May 2 – Kate Baldwin, singer and actress
 May 3
 Christina Hendricks, actress
 Dulé Hill, actor and tap dancer ***
 Kimora Lee Simmons, fashion designer
 May 4 – Andy Khachaturian, drummer for System of a Down (1994—1997)
 May 6
 Jesse Bering, psychologist, writer, and academic
 Eric Boguniecki, ice hockey player
 May 7 – Big Noyd, rapper
 May 8
 Dan Andelman, radio host
 Nathan Buttke, stock car racing driver
 May 9 – Lane Kiffin, football player and coach
 May 10
 Andrea Anders, actress
 Julie Nathanson, actress and voice actress
 May 11 – Coby Bell, actor
 May 12
 Lawrence Phillips, American-born Canadian football player
 Jared Polis, politician, 43rd Governor of Colorado
 May 13
 Brad Bohannon, basketball player and coach
 Mickey Callaway, baseball player and coach
 Michael Cloud, politician
 Brian Geraghty, actor
 May 14
 Rashid Atkins, basketball player
 Sean Bielat, businessman and political candidate
 May 15 – Ray Lewis, football player
 May 17
 Richard H. Blake, actor and singer
 James Brown, football player
 May 18
 Flozell Adams, football player
 Joe Bunn, basketball player
 Jack Johnson, singer/songwriter
 May 19 – London Fletcher, football player
 May 20
 Andrew Sega, musician
 Marc Thompson, voice actor
 May 21 – John David Anderson, writer
 May 22
 Jedediah Aaker, musician
 AverySunshine, singer/songwriter and pianist
 May 23 – LaMonica Garrett, actor and slamball player
 May 24
 Jamie Baldridge, photographer and educator
 Alex Lacamoire, musical arranger
 May 26
 Nicki Aycox, actress and musician (d. 2022)
 Lauryn Hill, actress, singer/songwriter, rapper and producer
 May 27
 André 3000, musician, record producer, actor, and member of Outkast
 Jenny Oaks Baker, violinist
 May 29
 Matt Bryant, football player
 David Burtka, actor and professional chef
 Daniel Tosh, comedian
 May 30
 Brian Fair, singer and frontman for Shadows Fall
 CeeLo Green, singer/songwriter, television personality, and frontman for Gnarls Barkley

June

 June 1
 John Barresi, sport kite flier
 Bryan Konietzko, animator
 June 2 – Zia McCabe, keyboardist for The Dandy Warhols
 June 3 – Amy McGrath, Marine fighter pilot and political candidate
 June 4
 Nikki Araguz, same-sex marriage activist, author, and public speaker (died 2019)
 Henry Burris, football player and coach
 Angelina Jolie, actress and director
 Theo Rossi, actor and producer
 June 5 – Scott Holroyd, actor
 June 7
 Brian Alford, football player
 Jason Brodeur, politician
 Allen Iverson, basketball player
 June 8 – Michael Buckley, YouTube personality
 June 10 – Nicole Bilderback, South Korean-born actress
 June 12 – Bryan Alvarez, wrestler, martial artist, satellite radio host, podcaster, and journalist
 June 14 – Rob Bohlinger, football player
 June 15
 Jim Bridenstine, politician
 C. J. Brown, soccer player and coach
 June 17 – Mark Brownson, baseball player (d. 2017)
 June 19
 Anthony Parker, basketball player
 Geoff Ramsey, voice actor and producer, co-founder of Rooster Teeth
 June 20
 Nate Bjorkgren, basketball coach
 Eric Schmitt, politician
 June 21
 Greg Bellisari, football player
 Oscar Wood, wrestler 
 June 22
 Leraldo Anzaldua, voice actor, director, scriptwriter, and stunt coordinator
 Jeff Hephner, actor
 June 23 – Alisa Burras, basketball player
 June 24
 Vanessa Atterbeary, politician
 Shontel Brown, politician
 Dan Browne, Olympic sprinter
 Carla Gallo, actress
 Christie Pearce, soccer player
 June 25 – Linda Cardellini, actress
 June 27
 Bill Beckwith, carpenter and television personality (d. 2013)
 Tobey Maguire, actor and producer

July

 July 1
 Koichi Fukuda, Japanese-born guitarist for Static-X
 Tobias Read, politician
 Sufjan Stevens, musician
 July 2
 Sheri Bueter Hauser, soccer player
 Elizabeth Reaser, actress
 July 3 – Ryan McPartlin, actor
 July 4
 Keith R. Blackwell, judge
 John Lloyd Young, actor and singer
 July 5 – Sope Aluko, Nigerian-born British-American actress
 July 6
 50 Cent, rapper, actor, and businessman
 Nate Barlow, director, actor, screenwriter, and producer
 July 7
 Tony Benshoof, Olympic luger
 Jason Brilz, mixed martial artist
 July 8 – Jamal Woolard, actor and rapper
 July 9
 Shelton Benjamin, wrestler
 Will Blackwell, football player
 Isaac Brock, singer/songwriter, guitarist, and frontman for Modest Mouse
 Robert Koenig, director and producer
 Jack White, singer and guitarist, frontman for The White Stripes
 July 11
 Bridgette Andersen, actress (d. 1997)
 Willie Anderson, football player
 Spencer Cox, politician, 18th Governor of Utah
 Jon Wellner, actor
 July 12
 Rich Barcelo, golfer
 Jason Bellini, journalist
 Cheyenne Jackson, actor and singer
 July 13 – Danni Boatwright, actress, host, sports journalist, model, and beauty queen
 July 14 – Amy Acuff, Olympic high jumper
 July 17
 Daffney, wrestler, manager, and actress (died 2021)
 Terence Tao, Australian-born mathematician
 July 18
 Bleu, musician, singer/songwriter, and record producer
 Torii Hunter, baseball player
 Daron Malakian, guitarist and vocalist for System of a Down
 July 19
 Heather Armstrong, blogger
 Patricia Ja Lee, actress and model
 July 20
 Ray Allen, basketball player
 Judy Greer, actress and author
 Jason Raize, actor and activist (d. 2004)
 July 21
 Larry Atkins, football player
 Christopher Barzak, author
 Diego Buñuel, French-born filmmaker
 David Dastmalchian, actor
 July 22
 Justi Baumgardt, soccer player
 Nikki Boyer, actress and singer/songwriter
 July 24
 Jamie Langenbrunner, ice hockey player
 Eric Szmanda, actor
 Torrie Wilson, wrestler and model
 July 25 – Dallas Jenkins, director, writer, and producer
 July 26 – Kevin Barker, baseball player and analyst
 July 27
 Brad Barr, guitarist and singer/songwriter
 Shea Hillenbrand, baseball player
 Alex Rodriguez, baseball player
 July 28
 Huma Abedin, political staffer
 Corey Albano, American-born Italian basketball player
 Gerald Brown, basketball player
 July 29 – Terrence Wilkins, football player
 July 31
 Uriah Duffy, bassist
 Annie Parisse, actress

August

 August 2
 Blitzkrieg, wrestler
 Nick Loeb, businessman and actor
 August 3
 Rosalynn Bliss, politician, mayor of Grand Rapids, Michigan
 Roosevelt Brown, baseball player
 August 4 – Andy Hallett, singer and actor (d. 2009)
 August 6
 Franklin DeWayne Alix, convicted rapist, robber, kidnapper, and killer (d. 2010)
 Ryan Martinie, bassist for Mudvayne
 August 7 – Charlize Theron, South African-born actress
 August 8
 Leon Bender, football player (d. 1998)
 Ben Weinman, guitarist for The Dillinger Escape Plan
 August 11
 Alex Bernstein, football player
 Roger Craig Smith, voice actor
 August 12
 Casey Affleck, actor and film director
 Carter Bays, author, composer, and showrunner
 August 14 – Jill Bennett, actress
 August 15
 Wes Allen, politician
 William Antonio, basketball player
 Bertrand Berry, football player
 Elaine Luria, politician
 Kara Wolters, basketball player
 August 16 
 George Stults, model and actor
 Magic, rapper (504 Boyz and Body Head Bangerz) (d. 2013)
 August 18
 Craig Brown, Olympic curler
 Kaitlin Olson, actress
 August 19
 Stuart Bishop, politician
 Chynna Clugston, illustrator
 August 20
 Michael Africk, singer/songwriter
 Rob Beckley, Christian singer and frontman for Pillar
 August 21 – Mike Altman, Olympic rower
 August 23 – Joe Andruzzi, football player
 August 27
 Blake Adams, golfer
 Johnny Moseley, Olympic freestyle skier and television host
 August 28
 Ryan Bailey, Olympic water polo player
 Eugene Byrd, actor
 August 29 – Dante Basco, actor
 August 30 – Francesco Bilotto, television design and entertaining expert
 August 31 – Sara Ramirez, actress

September

 September 1
 Hassan Booker, basketball player
 Chad Brown, soccer player
 Ammon Bundy, activist involved in the 2014 Staffoff at Bundy Ranch, leader behind the 2016 Occupation of the Malheur National Wildlife Refuge, and political candidate
 Omar Rodríguez-López, Puerto Rican-born guitarist and songwriter
 September 2
 Calvin Ball III, politician
 Cory Barlog, video game designer, director, and writer
 Carla Berube, basketball player and coach
 September 3 – Redfoo, disc jockey
 September 5
 Rod Barajas, baseball player
 J. P. Calderon, volleyball player, model and reality show personality 
 September 6 – Derrek Lee, baseball player
 September 8 – Mike Brown, mixed martial artist
 September 10
 Kyle Bornheimer, actor and comedian
 Jeff Bowler, producer
 R. Luke DuBois, composer and artist
 September 12 – Casey Alexander, cartoonist, animator, storyboard artist, writer, director, and producer
 September 13 – Peter Ho, American-born Taiwanese singer and actor
 September 14 – John Haughm, singer, guitarist, and frontman for Agalloch (1996 – 2016) and Pillorian (2016-2019)
 September 15 – Robyn Ah Mow-Santos, Olympic volleyball player and coach
 September 16 – Jesse Aron, Elvis tribute artist
 September 17
 Jimmie Johnson, race car driver
 Constantine Maroulis, singer 
 September 18
 Chris Achuff, football coach
 Charlie Finn, actor  
 Jason Sudeikis, actor, comedian, screenwriter and producer
 September 19
 Marty Belafsky, actor and comedian
 Oscar Bettison, British-born composer
 September 20
 Jim Ananich, politician
 Moon Bloodgood, actress
 September 21
 Elan Atias, reggae singer/songwriter
 Chris Avery, football player
 James Lesure, actor
 Lil Rob, rapper, producer and actor
 September 22 – Mireille Enos, actress
 September 23
 Jaime Bergman, model and actress
 Lorenzo Bromell, football player
 Dave Elder, baseball player (d. 2023)
 September 24 – Peter Abbarno, politician
 September 25
 David Blair, Paralympic discus thrower
 Matt Hasselbeck, football player
 September 27 – Jason Annicchero, soccer player
 September 28 – Mandy Barnett, country singer
 September 29 – Waraire Boswell, fashion designer and entrepreneur
 September 30
 Javier Arau, composer, saxophonist, conductor, theorist, author, and entrepreneur
 Jay Asher, writer and novelist
 Ta-Nehisi Coates, author and journalist
 Christopher Jackson, actor, musician, and composer

October

 October 1 – Grace Meng, politician
 October 3
 India Arie, singer/songwriter
 Jake Braun, politician
 Jon Buscemi, fashion designer
 Alanna Ubach, actress and singer
 October 4
 Ken Anderson, football player
 Reggie Lee, Philippine-born actor
 October 5
 Erick Allen, politician
 Monica Rial, voice actress
 Scott Weinger, actor, voice actor, writer and producer
 October 6 – Lisa Ann Coleman, child murderer
 October 7 
 Justin Brunette, baseball player
 Rhyno, wrestler
 Jamie Hector, actor
 October 8
 Jon Blackman, football player
 Marc Molinaro, politician
 October 9
 Sean Lennon, British-born musician, songwriter, producer, and multi-instrumentalist
 Nate Newton, bassist and guitarist
 October 10 – Richard Beaudoin, composer
 October 11 – Klee Benally, singer, guitarist, and frontman for Blackfire
 October 12 – Ahmad, rapper, songwriter, motivational speaker, and author
 October 14
 Jason Boyce, soccer player
 Floyd Landis, cyclist
 October 15
 Chris Baldwin, cyclist
 Joy Bisco, actress
 Joe Golding, basketball player and coach.
 October 16 – Alexandra Barreto, actress
 October 17
 Ibiyinka Alao, Nigerian-born artist, architect, writer, director, and composer
 Francis Bouillon, American-born Canadian ice hockey player
 October 18 – Brandon Wolff, mixed martial artist and Navy SEAL
 October 19
 Benjamin Heckendorn, electronics modifier and independent filmmaker
 James L. Venable, composer
 October 20 – Natalie Gregory, actress
 October 21 – Frank Burns, politician
 October 22
 Tom Basile, politician
 Jesse Tyler Ferguson, actor
 Patrick McHenry, politician
 Mike Riley, cartoonist
 October 23
 Keith Van Horn, basketball player
 Michelle Beadle, sports reporter and host
 Todd Belitz, baseball player
 Boti Bliss, actress
 October 24 – Melissa Hutchison, voice actress
 October 26 – Ryan Bradley, baseball player
 October 27 – Aron Ralston, outdoorsman, mechanical engineer, and motivational speaker
 October 30 – Keith Brooking, football player

November

 November 1 – Bo Bice, singer and American Idol contestant
 November 2
 Camille Bloom, singer/songwriter
 Vis Brown, actor
 Danny Cooksey, actor and comedian
 November 3 – Demetrius Alexander, basketball player
 November 4 – Lorenzen Wright, basketball player (d. 2010)
 November 5
 Jamie Madrox, rapper
 Keala Settle, actress and singer
 November 7
 Stephen Alexander, football player
 Marcus Luttrell, U.S. Navy SEAL
 Morgan Luttrell, U.S. Navy SEAL and politician
 November 8
 Brevin Knight, basketball player
 Steve J. Palmer, actor and producer
 Tara Reid, actress
 November 9 – Sean Bennett, American-born Canadian football player
 November 10
 Jim Adkins, singer, guitarist, and frontman for Jimmy Eat World
 Derrick Baskin, actor
 David Bellavia, U.S. Army Staff Sergeant and Medal of Honor recipient
 Todd Bratrud, skateboard artist and designer
 November 11 – Angélica Vale, Mexican-born actress, singer, and comedian
 November 12
 Brian Ah Yat, football player
 Des Bishop, British-born American-Irish comedian
 Guy Branum, comedian, writer, and actor
 Jason Lezak, Olympic swimmer
 November 14
 Jason Bare, Christian singer/songwriter
 Travis Barker, musician and drummer for blink-182, +44, and Box Car Racer
 Stephen Guarino, actor
 Gary Vaynerchuk, Belarusian-born entrepreneur and internet personality
 November 15 – J. C. Brandy, British-born actress
 November 17
 Abstract Rude, rapper
 Leon Dorsey, convicted murderer (d. 2008)
 November 18
 Neal E. Boyd, singer and reality show winner for America's Got Talent (d. 2018)
 David Ortiz, Dominican-born baseball player
 November 19
 Matthew Akers, director, producer, cinematographer, and photographer
 Toby Bailey, basketball player and sports agent
 Mike Burgess, politician
 November 20
 Julien Aklei, singer/songwriter, guitarist, and artist
 Dierks Bentley, country singer
 Francis Bouillon, basketball player
 Joshua Gomez, actor
 Davey Havok, alternative rock singer and frontman for AFI
 Ptolemy Slocum, actor
 November 21
 Cherie Johnson, actress
 Chris Moneymaker, poker player
 November 22
 Daniel R. Benson, politician
 James Madio, actor
 November 23 – Wiley Nickel, politician
 November 24 – Thomas Kohnstamm, writer
 November 26
 Frankie Archuleta, boxer
 Christopher Bollen, novelist and magazine writer
 DJ Khaled, DJ, record executive, songwriter, record producer, and media personality
 November 27 – Bad Azz, rapper (d. 2019)
 November 28 – Jonathan Brown, American-born Canadian football player
 November 30
 Mark Blount, basketball player
 Mindy McCready, country singer (d. 2013)
 IronE Singleton, actor

December

 December 1 – David Hornsby, actor, screenwriter, and producer
 December 3
 Mickey Avalon, rapper
 Malinda Williams, actress and producer
 December 4 – D'Wayne Bates, football player
 December 5
 Paula Patton, actress
 Nick Stahl, actor and producer
 December 6 – Mia Love, politician
 December 7
 Raj Bhakta, entrepreneur, spirits industry executive, and real estate investor
 Pat Bianchi, jazz organist
 Seth Meisterman, artist
 December 8
 Brian Barkley, baseball player
 Corey Bradford, football player
 Kevin Harvick, race car driver
 December 9 – Travis Atkins, U.S Army soldier and Medal of Honor recipient (d. 2007)
 December 10
 Steve Bradley, wrestler (d. 2008)
 Joe Mays, baseball pitcher
 December 12
 Mayim Bialik, actress and neuroscientist
 Bobbi Billard, wrestler, actress, model, and author
 December 13
 Andy Bachetti, race car driver
 Brian Baenig, government official
 Bates Battaglia, ice hockey player
 Michael Baumgartner, politician
 C. J. Bruton, American-born Australian basketball player
 Tom DeLonge, musician, author, UFOlogist, guitarist and singer for blink-182, Box Car Racer, and Angels & Airwaves
 December 14 – KaDee Strickland, actress
 December 17
 Nick Dinsmore, wrestler
 Milla Jovovich, Ukrainian-born actress and model
 Steve Zissis, actor
 December 18
 Caesar Bacarella, stock car racing driver
 Jay Bakker, pastor, author, and speaker
 Randy Houser, country music singer
 December 19
 Russell Branyan, baseball player
 Breez Evahflowin', rapper
 December 23
 Brian Babylon, comedian and radio host
 Ilan Berman, lawyer and educator
 Cindy Blodgett, basketball player
 December 26 – Deena Aljuhani Abdulaziz, business woman and editor
 December 27 – Heather O'Rourke, actress (d. 1988)
 December 28
 Daniel Beaty, actor, singer, writer, composer, and poet
 Mark Boidman, Canadian-born investment banker and attorney
 December 29 – Shawn Hatosy, actor
 December 30 – Tiger Woods, golfer

Full Date Unknown

 David Adams, video game designer
 Pearl Aday, singer
 Deborah Adler, designer
 Shiva Ahmadi, Iranian-born artist
 Cardenas J. Alban, U.S. Army Staff Sergeant and convicted murderer
 Ahmed Alsoudani, Iraqi-born artist
 Casey Anderson, filmmaker, wildlife naturalist, and television presenter
 John C. Anderson, lawyer and Attorney for the United States District Court for the District of New Mexico
 Bryan Andrews, filmmaker
 Josephine Angelini, author
 Scott D. Anthony, author and senior partner for Innosight
 Sam Apple, writer
 Vicente Archer, jazz musician
 Jason Farnham, composer, performer, and record producer
 Teresa Alonso Leon, politician
 Shea Backus, politician
 Gaiutra Bahadur, Guyanese-born writer
 Kristin Baker, painter
 Dean Bakopoulos, writer
 Mandi Ballinger, politician
 Scott Banister, entrepreneur, angel investor, and founder of IronPort
 Rachel Barenblat, poet, rabbi, chaplain, and blogger
 Ty Barnett, actor and stand-up comic
 Kevin Baron, journalist
 Holly Bass, artist, poet, dancer, educator, and activist
 Mohamad Bazzi, Lebanese--born journalist
 Glenn Belverio, journalist
 Joshua Benton, journalist and writer
 Sigmar Berg, Austrian-born entrepreneur, artist, photographer, and fashion designer
 Cassie Berman, musician
 Joanna Bernabei-McNamee, basketball player and coach
 Katherine Bernhardt, artist
 Sherwin Bitsui, writer and poet
 Shanir Ezra Blumenkranz, bassist and oud player
 Benjamin Bolger, perpetual student and University professor
 Shawnna Bolick, politician
 Christian Bowman, actor, director, producer, and screenwriter
 Anu Bradford, Finnish-born author, law professor, and international trade law expert
 Joe Bradley, artist and singer
 Slater Bradley, artist
 Catherine P. Bradshaw, psychologist
 Tarren Bragdon, politician
 Adam L. Braverman, attorney
 Brian Bress, artist
 David Brooks, artist
 Jeffrey Brown, cartoonist
 Lars Brownworth, podcaster and educator
 Catherine Brunell, actress
 Thi Bui, Vietnam-born novelist and illustrator
 Abraham Burickson, poet and artist
 A.K. Burns, artist
 Casey Burns, illustrator, screen printer, rock poster artist, musician, and advertising art director
 Rachel Kramer Bussel, author, columnist, and editor
 Mark Bussler, filmmaker, entrepreneur, and comic creator
 Taylor Ho Bynum, musician, composer, educator, and writer
 Nadine Burke Harris, Canadian-born pediatrician
 Rake Yohn, television personality and stunt performer

Deaths

 January 7 – Harry Gunnison Brown, academic economist (b. 1880)
 January 8 – Louis P. Lochner, political activist, journalist and author (b. 1887)
 January 18 – Evelyn Greeley, silent film actress (b. 1888)
 January 19 – Thomas Hart Benton, painter (b. 1889)
 January 27 – Bill Walsh, film producer and writer (b. 1913)
 February 4 – Louis Jordan, African American swing band leader (b. 1908)
 February 5 – George Rowe, silent film character actor (b. 1894)
 February 10 – Dave Alexander, musician (b. 1947)
 February 14 – P. G. Wodehouse, comic writer (b. 1881 in the United Kingdom)
 February 16 – Morgan Taylor, Olympic hurdler (b. 1903)
 February 25 – Elijah Muhammad, Nation of Islam leader (b. 1897)
 March 14 – Susan Hayward, film actress (b. 1917)
 March 30 – Pancho Barnes, pioneer aviator (b. 1901)
 April 19 – Percy Lavon Julian, African American research chemist (b. 1899)
 April 20 – John Vachon, photographer (b. 1914)
 May 4 – (Richard) Two Ton Baker, entertainer (b. 1916)
 June 6 – Larry Blyden, actor and game show host (b. 1925)
 June 15 – William Austin, film character actor (b. 1884 in the United Kingdom)
 July 16 – Lester Dragstedt, surgeon (b 1893)
 September 6 – Shelton Brooks, African American song composer (b. 1886 in Canada)
 October 1 – Larry MacPhail, lawyer and baseball executive (b. 1890)
 October 4 – May Sutton, tennis player (b. 1886)
 October 16 – Benjamin McCandlish, Governor of Guam (b. 1886)
 November 5 – Julian C. Smith, general (b. 1885)
 November 14 – Harry J. Anslinger, 1st Commissioner of the Federal Bureau of Narcotics (b. 1892)
 December 24 – Bernard Herrmann, composer and husband of Lucille Fletcher (b. 1911)

See also 
List of American films of 1975
 Timeline of United States history (1970–1989)

References

External links
 

 
1970s in the United States
United States
United States
Years of the 20th century in the United States